Martin Moss (born December 16, 1958) is a former American football defensive end. He played for the Detroit Lions from 1982 to 1985.

References

1958 births
Living people
American football defensive ends
UCLA Bruins football players
Detroit Lions players